Andante may refer to:

Arts 
 Andante (tempo), a moderately slow musical tempo
 Andante (manga), a shōjo manga by Miho Obana
 "Andante" (song), a song by Hitomi Yaida
 "Andante, Andante", a 1980 song by ABBA from Super Trouper
 Andante (TV series), a South Korean television series
 "Andante" (Homeland), an episode of Homeland
 "Andante", a song by Super Junior from A-Cha, a repackage of Mr. Simple

Toponyms 
 Andante Mount, a peak in Jacques-Cartier National Park, Capitale-Nationale, Quebec, Canada

See also 

 Winsome Andante, a British sport horse
 The Andantes, a 1960s female sessions group for Motown
 Andante ticket, a public transport ticketing system in Porto, Portugal